Mastigiidae is a family of true jellyfish. The family is native to the Indo-Pacific, but a species of Mastigias has been introduced to the West Atlantic, and Phyllorhiza punctata has been introduced to the West Atlantic and Mediterranean Sea.

Genera
According to the World Register of Marine Species, this family includes 4 genera:

 Mastigias
 Mastigietta
 Phyllorhiza
 Versuriga – probably belongs in a separate monotypic family, Versurigidae.

References

 
Kolpophorae
Cnidarian families